Hypatopa musa is a moth in the family Blastobasidae. It is found in Costa Rica.

The length of the forewings is 3.8–5.2 mm. The forewings are greyish brown intermixed with greyish-brown scales tipped with white and white scales. The hindwings are translucent pale brown.

Etymology
The specific name refers to Musa, goddess of music, literature and the arts.

References

Moths described in 2013
Hypatopa